Jeenbekov is a masculine surname, its feminine counterpart is Jeenbekova. Notable people with the surname include:
Aigul Jeenbekova, First Lady of Kyrgyzstan 
Asylbek Jêênbekov (born 1963), Kyrgyz politician
Sooronbay Jeenbekov (born 1958), Kyrgyz politician, elected President of Kyrgyzstan